This is a list of the 90 members of the seventh Northern Ireland Assembly, the unicameral devolved legislature of Northern Ireland. The election took place on 5 May 2022, with counting continuing the following 2 days; voter turnout was estimated at 64.4%.

Five MLAs were elected from each of the 18 constituencies. Sinn Féin became the biggest party for the first time, entitling them to the First Minister. Additionally, Alliance, the biggest cross-community party, also had a big increase, overtaking the SDLP and UUP in votes to become third in the assembly, following the DUP, the biggest Unionist party.

Party strengths

Graphical representation 
Parties arranged roughly on the nationalist-unionist spectrum

MLAs by party 

* Party Leader in Stormont

† Co-opted to replace an elected MLA

‡ Changed affiliation during the term

MLAs by constituency 
Members are ranked by their order of election, and if co-opted, the position of the person who they co-opted.

* Party Leader in Stormont

† Co-opted to replace an elected MLA

‡ Changed affiliation during the term

Changes since the election

† Co-options

‡ Changes in affiliation 
No Changes since 5 May 2022

Notes

References 

 
Lists of members of the Northern Ireland Assembly